Voranava or Voronovo is a town in Belarus, in Grodno Region. It is the administrative center of the Voranava district.

History 
Within the Grand Duchy of Lithuania, Voranava was part of Vilnius Voivodeship. In 1795, the town was acquired by the Russian Empire in the course of the Third Partition of Poland.

From 1921 until 1939, Voranava was part of the Second Polish Republic. In September 1939, the town was occupied by the Red Army and, on 14 November 1939, incorporated into the Byelorussian SSR. From 23 June 1941 until 11 July 1944, Voranava was occupied by Nazi Germany and administered as a part of the Generalbezirk Weißruthenien of Reichskommissariat Ostland.

Population 
 1865 — 468 people, (333 Jews, 117 Catholics, 18 Orthodox).
 1905 — 500
 1921 — 1,232
 1976 — 3,600
 1990 — 6,800
 1996 — 6,700
 2004 — 6,600
 2005 — 6,559
 2006 — 6,498
 2007 — 6,400 
 2008 — 6,400
 2015 — 6,200
 2016 — 6,434
In Voronovo district today live more than 32,000 people, 83% are ethnic Poles.

Sights

External links 
 Official website
 Website of Voronovo's newspaper
  Hotel in Voronovo
 

Lidsky Uyezd
Nowogródek Voivodeship (1919–1939)
Populated places in Grodno Region
Urban-type settlements in Belarus
Vilnius Voivodeship
Voranava District